Sport Clube Beira-Mar is a Portuguese sports club based in Aveiro, Portugal. Its football team currently plays in the Campeonato de Portugal, the fourth national level, having gained promotion by winning the Aveiro FA First Division 2018/19 championship season. The old Estádio Mário Duarte was the home ground from 1935 until 2019. From 2020, SC Beira-Mar plays home matches at Estádio Municipal de Aveiro. The club also has futsal, basketball, boxing, judo, handball, billiards, athletics, and paintball departments.

Famous Portuguese players who have represented the club include Eusébio, António Veloso, and António Sousa. All three players have regularly been chosen for the Portugal national team and have played for the biggest clubs in the country—the former two with Benfica and the latter with both Porto and Sporting CP. After becoming a manager, Sousa also coached the team, guiding it to win the 1999 Taça de Portugal. Sport Clube Beira-Mar is a very representative club in the Centro Region.

History
thumb|right|200px|Eusébio, one of the world's greatest footballers, played for Beira-Mar in the 1976–77 season.

Beira-Mar was founded on 1 January 1922. It first reached the top division in 1961, only lasting one season. Subsequently, Beira-Mar reached the top flight several times enjoying a spell lasting from 1971 to 1974. In the 1976–77 campaign, former S.L. Benfica and Portugal legend Eusébio signed up to play for Beira-Mar, requesting to be excluded in all matches against S.L. Benfica. Injuries prevented him from being fielded regularly, and the campaign ended in relegation.

In 1988 Beira-Mar returned to the "Primeira Divisão" managing to remain there most of the following years and achieving a best ever sixth place overall finish in the 1990/91 top league season and also reaching the Cup final. In 1999 the club again reached the Cup final, this time defeating S.C. Campomaiorense 1–0 to win the Taça de Portugal. Beira-Mar's goal was scored by Ricardo Sousa, son of coach António Sousa, who played for the club in the 1970s. Despite winning its biggest honour to date, the team was relegated at season's end.

As the UEFA Cup Winners' Cup was discontinued in 1999, Beira-Mar participated in the 1999–2000 UEFA Cup, losing 1–2 on aggregate to Dutch club Vitesse. In the domestic league, the club finished second place in the second division, automatically returning to the top flight. On 23 February 2002, Beira-Mar achieved a 3–2 away win against FC Porto, which was managed by a young José Mourinho; it would be his last home defeat in the following decade.

In 2006, former European Golden Shoe winner Mário Jardel returned to Portugal to play for Beira-Mar, signing a one-year contract. The Brazilian scored in his official debut, a 2–2 home draw against Desportivo das Aves, but gradually lost his importance in the team and later transferred to a club in Cyprus. In 2007 Beira-Mar was relegated in a campaign that included the sacking of manager Carlos Carvalhal, who was replaced by Spaniard Francisco Soler after the team signed a deal with Inverfutbol, a Spanish-based sporting company.

In 2010, Beira-Mar finished the season as second division champions and returned to the top division after a three-year absence. In 2013, the team was relegated to the second division for finishing in last place. In 2015, Beira-Mar was demoted by administrative decree to the second-lowest league of the Aveiro FA district (Associação de Futebol de Aveiro), the fifth lowest overall level in the pyramid, despite finishing tenth, due to financial difficulties and debt. 
According to the FA legislation, the club was found ineligible to participate in national competitions and had to restart competitive activity from the bottom in the regional levels.

Following promotions in 2016 and 2019, Beira-Mar returned to the national leagues, entering the third-tier Campeonato de Portugal for the 2019–20 season.

Current squad

League and Cup history

European record
By qualifying to play in the 1999 edition of UEFA Cup, Beira-Mar became the second team from a second division to appear in the competition, after Bray Wanderers from the Republic of Ireland in 1990.

Honours

National
Taça de Portugal
Winners (1): 1998–99

Segunda Liga
Winners (2): 2005–06, 2009–10

Segunda Divisão
Winners (3): 1960–61, 1964–65, 1970–71

Terceira Divisão
Winners (1): 1958–59

Other
Taça Ribeiro dos Reis
Winners (1): 1964–65

AF Aveiro Championship
Winners (4): 1928–29, 1937–38, 2018–19, 2021–22

AF Aveiro First Division
Winners (3): 1948–49, 1955–56, 1958–59

AF Aveiro Cup
Winners (2): 2017–18, 2021–22

AF Aveiro Supercup
Winners (2): 2019, 2021

Stadiums

From 1935 until 2019, Beira-Mar played home games at Estádio Mário Duarte, a 12,000- seating capacity ground in the city center. However, during this time, there were exceptions to Mario Duarte stadium use exclusivity when Beira-Mar occasionally used the new Municipal Stadium, purpose built for the 2004 Euro Championship. 
After the 2015 relegation, due to the poor economic situation of the club, Mario Duarte Stadium played an important role in the team recovering their support base due to the ease of access by the local fans. 

Due to the stadium's ground being conveniently situated next door, the latest city planning and infrastructure developments require the area presently occupied by Mario Duarte Stadium for the long waiting expansion of Aveiro's main regional hospital. As a result of these developments, the city authorities reached a deal with the club for the use of the new  Estádio Municipal de Aveiro by Beira-Mar S. C..
This modern 32000 seat stadium was purpose built to host some matches in the 2004 Euro Championship, is currently undergoing further development on its adjoining grounds by the Aveiro Football Association to establish new training facilities and a football academy. Nevertheless, due to the stadium's position being about 5 km outside the city limits next to the highway, does not enjoy public transportation accesses or shuttle services, thus, it never was very popular with Beira-Mar home or visiting supporters, who preferred the old historical stadium's cosiness and ease of access.
To counter the stadium's lack of popularity due to accessibility problems, the local authorities are studying the implementation of a new shuttle service scheme incorporating the metropolitan bus services for match days, to help supporters reach the stadium easily. A passenger link from Aveiro railway station could also become a reality in the future by using the existing Vouga railway line that passes a few hundred meters from the stadium.

Notable players
Note: this list includes players who have played at least 100 league games and/or have reached international status.

 Eugene Galeković
 Mário Jardel
 Fernando Aguiar
 Pavel Srníček
 Magdi Abdelghani
 Javier Balboa
 Nazmi Faiz
 Mourtala Diakité
 Andrija Delibašić
 Antolín Alcaraz
 Dinis
 Eusébio
 António Sousa
 António Veloso
 Fary Faye
 Marián Zeman
 Jan Lechaba
 Tobias Grahn
 Andy Marriott

Former managers

 Fernando Vaz (1975–76)
 Fernando Cabrita (1977–79)
 Mário Lino (1986–87)
 Jean Thissen (1987–90)
 Zoran Filipović (1993–94)
 Rodolfo Reis (1994–95)
 Acácio (1995)
 António Sousa (1997 – 2004)
 Mick Wadsworth (July 2004 – Sept 04)
 Manuel Cajuda (Sept 2004 – Dec 04)
 Augusto Inácio (April 2005 – Nov 06)
 Carlos Carvalhal (Nov 2006 – Jan 07)
 Francisco Soler (Jan 2007 – May 7)
 Rogério Gonçalves (May 2007 – Feb 08)
 Paulo Sérgio (Feb 2008 – May 8)
 António Sousa (June 2008 – Nov 08)
 Leonardo Jardim (May 2009 – Feb 11)
 Rui Bento (March 2011 – Feb 12)
 Ulisses Morais (Feb 2012 – Feb 13)
 Costinha (Feb 2013 – May 13)
 Jorge Neves (May 2013 – January 14)

References

External links

Official website 

 
Association football clubs established in 1922
Taça de Portugal winners
1922 establishments in Portugal
Primeira Liga clubs
Liga Portugal 2 clubs
Football clubs in Portugal